Gowd-e Asia (also Romanized as Gowd-e Āsīā) is a village in Qasabeh-ye Gharbi Rural District, in the Central District of Sabzevar County, Razavi Khorasan Province, Iran. As of the 2006 census, its population is 390, with 143 families living in the village.

References 

Populated places in Sabzevar County